Rafael Gonzáles (1789–1857) was a Tejano military leader and Governor of the Mexican state of Coahuila y Tejas from 1824 to 1826.

Early life 
Gonzáles was born in San Antonio de Béxar in 1789. He joined the military as a cadet to collaborate at the Nuestra Señora de Loreto presidio. In October 1810, at age 20, Gonzáles was made Second Alferez, and two years later he earned the title of First Alferez.

Career 

On June 3, 1814, Gonzáles got the degree of Second lieutenant, and joined the presidio's garrison of Monclova (Coahuila, in modern Mexico). One year later, on July 14, 1815, he was promoted to first lieutenant of the Royalist company of Presidio de Rio Grande, and on May 18, 1818 he reached the rank of captain.

On July 3, 1821, Gonzáles participated in the Mexican War of Independence. On December 12, 1821 he was promoted to lieutenant colonel. On August 15, 1824, he was appointed governor of Coahuila and Texas.  In that year, Gonzales granted each Shawnee family who settled in Texas a square mile of land in the south bank of Red River.

He was governor of Coahuila and Texas until March 15, 1826, when he was replaced by Victor Blanco. In 1834 Gonzales was appointed secretary of Coahuila and Texas. He died in 1857.

Legacy
The town of Gonzales, Texas was named to honor his bravery.

References

External links
 Texas State Historical Association
 Texas State Library and Archives Commission

Governors of Mexican Texas
People from San Antonio
1789 births
1857 deaths
19th-century American politicians
Tejano politicians